is an anime audio director and producer. He graduated from Tokyo University of Education and went on to form the Jiyū Theatre Troupe. Shiba then joined Omnibus Promotion, where he worked on anime television series, OVAs, and movies.

Anime
All credits are for audio director unless otherwise indicated.

TV
Anime Himitsu no Kaen
Baldios
Eat-Man '98
Future Boy Conan 
High School! Kimen-gumi
Maison Ikkoku
Maitchingu Machiko-sensei
Ranma ½
Sei Jūshi Bismarck
Sherlock Hound (recording director)
Tanoshii Moomin Ikka
Tanoshii Moomin Ikka: Bōken Nikki
Urusei Yatsura

OVAs
Area 88
Bari Bari Densetsu (audio producer)
Cosmo Police Justy

Movies
Angel's Egg
Anime Sanjushi: Aramis no Bōken
Castle in the Sky 
Catnapped! (music director)
Digital Devil Story: Megami Tensei (recording director)
Dokaben (recording director)
Junkers Come Here 
Kenji no Trunk: Futago no Suisei
My Neighbor Totoro (audio producer)
Nausicaä of the Valley of the Wind
Only Yesterday (planning)
Patlabor the Movie
The Red Spectacles (producer)
Shirahata no Shōjo Ryūko
Shizuka na Gogo ni: Suika o Katta, Sawano Hitoshi (short film, audio producer)
Tanoshii Moomin Ikka: Muumindani no Suisei
Teito Monogatari (audio advisor)
They Were 11 (recording director)
Tobira o Akete (recording director)
Urusei Yatsura: Only You
Urusei Yatsura 2: Beautiful Dreamer
Urusei Yatsura 3: Remember My Love
Urusei Yatsura 4: Lum the Forever (recording director)
Xeno/Kagirinaki Ai ni

References

External links
 Japan Movie Database
 AllCinema Online

1932 births
Anime directors
Japanese film producers
Japanese television producers
Japanese voice directors
Living people
People from Tokyo